The Musée du Quai Branly – Jacques Chirac, located in Paris, France, is a museum designed by French architect Jean Nouvel to feature the indigenous art and cultures of Africa, Asia, Oceania, and the Americas. The museum collection comprises more than a million objects (ethnographic objects, photographs, documents, etc.), of which 3,500 are on display at any given time, in both permanent and temporary thematic exhibits. A selection of objects from the museum is also displayed in the Pavillon des Sessions of the Louvre.

The Quai Branly Museum opened in 2006; it is the newest of the major museums in Paris and received 1.15 million visitors in 2016. It is jointly administered by the French Ministry of Culture and Communication and the Ministry of Higher Education and Research, and serves as both a museum and as a center for research. The Musée du quai Branly is located in the 7th arrondissement of Paris, on the left bank of the Seine, close to the Eiffel Tower and the Pont de l'Alma.

The museum has been the subject of controversy, with some calling for the repatriation of its collections that were acquired through colonial conquest.

History 

Following the tradition of French presidents building museums as monuments to their time in office, as exemplified by Presidents Georges Pompidou (Centre Georges Pompidou); Valéry Giscard d'Estaing (Musée d'Orsay) and François Mitterrand (Grand Louvre), the project for a new museum celebrating the arts of the Americas, Africa, Asia and Oceania was brought to completion by President Jacques Chirac.

Since the first half of the 20th century, a number of French intellectuals and scientists, including André Malraux, André Breton, and Claude Lévi-Strauss, had called for a single and important museum in Paris dedicated to the arts and cultures of the indigenous people of the colonized territories, which was considered primitive peoples without own culture to the science of that time and the non-European art was considered exotic art, drawing upon the large collections gathered by French explorers, missionaries, scientists and ethnologists. A proposal for such a museum had been made by the ethnologist and art collector Jacques Kerchache in a 1990 manifesto in the newspaper Libération, called "The masterpieces of the entire world are born free and equal." The manifesto was signed by three hundred artists, writers, philosophers, anthropologists and art historians. Kerchache brought the idea to the attention of Jacques Chirac, then Mayor of Paris, and became his advisor. Chirac was elected president of France in 1995, and in the following year announced the creation of a new museum combining the collections of two different museums:
 the 25,000 objects of the Musée national des Arts d'Afrique et d'Océanie (The MAAO or National Museum of the Arts of Africa and Oceania), which had originally been created for the Colonial Exposition of 1931, and then remade in 1961 by André Malraux, the Minister of Culture under President Charles DeGaulle, into a museum dedicated to the cultures of the overseas possessions of France.
 the collections of the laboratory of ethnology of Musée de l'Homme ("Museum of Man"), which was created for the Paris Exposition of 1937 and contained 250,000 objects.

The two museums and collections were very different in their purposes and approaches; the MAAO was first and foremost an art collection, run by art historians and conservators, while the Museum of Man was run by ethnologists and anthropologists, and was most interested in the social-cultural context and uses of the objects.  As a result of this division, the new museum was put under two different ministries; the Ministry of Education, which oversaw the ethnological teaching and research; and the Ministry of Culture and Communication, which oversaw the art.

In addition to these existing collections, gathered by French explorers and ethnologists from around the world, the directors of the new museum acquired ten thousand objects.

The first venture of the new museum was the opening of a new gallery within the Louvre Museum, in the Pavillon des Sessions, dedicated to what were called the arts premiers, the "first arts".  The new section met immediate resistance; traditionalists felt that this kind of art did not belong in the Louvre, while many ethnologists felt that it risked splitting the collections into two parts, with the best objects going to the Louvre. The issue was resolved by a decree by President Chirac and the government of Prime Minister Lionel Jospin on 29 July 1998, to construct an entirely new museum at 29–55 quai Branly on the banks of the Seine not far from the Eiffel Tower in the 7th arrondissement of Paris. In December 1998, the museum was officially established, and Stéphane Martin was named its president.

The site selected for the new museum, covering an area of 25,000 square meters, was occupied by a collection of buildings belonging to the Ministry of Reconstruction and Urbanism. President François Mitterrand had originally intended it for one of his grand projects, an international conference center, but that project had been abandoned because of intense opposition from the residents of the neighborhood. At the beginning of 1999 a jury was formed and an international competition was held to select an architect. The competition was won by French architect Jean Nouvel, whose other major works included the Institute of the Arab World (1970), and Fondation Cartier (1991–94) in Paris, the renovation of the Lyon Opera (1986–93), the Palais de Justice in Nantes, and the Parc Poble Nou in Barcelona (2001).

In his design for the new museum, Nouvel took into account the criticisms of the neighbors who had blocked the Mitterrand project. The new museum was designed to be as out of sight as possible; the main building is designed to appear lower than the buildings around it, and is largely screened from view by its gardens. The shape of the main building follows the curve of the Seine, and the three administrative buildings are constructed to harmonize with the Haussmann-period buildings next to them.

In an attempt to create "an original venue that would do justice to the infinite diversity of cultures", the museum is designed in a way that that is supposed to feel open and inclusive. Nouvel designed the interior of the museum in such a way as to liberate artifacts from their Western architectural references by not including barriers and railings in the gallery spaces. There are no physical or spatial barriers separating the four main geographical areas, so visitors can go on a simulated "journey" by traveling from one continent to the other. Labels are almost hidden, and plaques with historical context are brief and generalized, in a way that seems to emphasize the aesthetic qualities of the displays rather than their cultural history.

Construction of the new museum began at the beginning of 2001, and was completed in 2005. The Musée du quai Branly was inaugurated on 20 June 2006 and opened to the public on 23 June.

Name
The museum opened under the name Musée du quai Branly, after the street alongside which it is built, a quay of the Seine named for the scientist Édouard Branly. Earlier suggestions were Musée du Trocadéro, after the home of the Musée de l'Homme where it was initially to be located, Musée des arts premiers ("first arts", corresponding to the politically incorrect "primitive art"), or Musée [de l'homme,] des arts et des civilisations ("museum of [man,] the arts and civilizations"). The anodyne location-based name was chosen to avoid controversy over terminology, although cynics felt it was a temporary name that would make it easier to rename it later after Jacques Chirac, the president who instigated the project. In June 2016 "Jacques Chirac" was appended to the museum's name.

Collections
The museum contains the collections of the now-closed Musée national des Arts d'Afrique et d'Océanie and the ethnographic department of the Musée de l'Homme, plus recently acquired objects. The permanent collection has 300,000 works, 700,000 photographs, 320,000 documents, 10,000 musical instruments, and 25,000 pieces of textile or clothing. The main collections area displays about 3500 objects, rotating 500 each year. The museum has both permanent exhibits and large exhibits which change every six months.  The museum also has thematic exhibits featuring masks and tapa cloth from Oceania, costumes from Asia, and musical instruments and textiles from Africa.

Temporary exhibits at the Museum touch upon a wide variety of subjects and themes. Themes of the exhibits in the summer of 2014 included the history and culture of tattoos, propaganda posters from Vietnam, and an exhibit about the influence of the culture of Oceania on American popular culture in the 20th century. This last exhibit, called "Tiki Pop", featured films, posters, music, clothing, and a recreation of a Polynesia-themed "tiki bar" from the 1960s.

Among its collections of ethnographic objects from Africa, Asia, America and Oceania, the museum has notable collections of objects, gathered during the French colonization of North America, from Quebec to Louisiana, in the 17th and 18th centuries. Another group of items presents the role of women voyagers in the 18th and 19th centuries. It also has a collection of paintings by Aboriginal Australians, in particular paintings made on eucalyptus tree bark. A small selection of the collected objects of the museum is regularly displayed in the Pavillon des Sessions of the Louvre Museum.

Restitution and repatriation

In 2018, the museum was at the center of a debate about the repatriation of objects that were removed from former French colonies during the period of colonialism. This was following the release of a report commissioned by President Emmanuel Macron and prepared by two academics, Bénédicte Savoy of France and Felwine Sarr of Senegal, who were asked to draw up a report on the restitution of African cultural heritage. This report argued that artifacts that were taken unlawfully throughout the French colonial period should be returned, if the country in question asks for them. Of the 90,000 sub-Saharan artifacts in France, 70,000 are in the archives or public exhibition of the Quai Branly Museum in Paris.  Following the report's publication, Macron promised to send to Benin 26 pieces that were forcibly removed during war from territory that now comprises part of Benin, though no French law or legislation currently exists that could enable such a promise. This is a complete shift from preceding French policy on the restitution of pieces collected during the colonial period. As an example, in 2016 the French government refused to return artifacts requested by the president of Benin, on the grounds that the French national collections are "inalienable", i.e. no part of them could be given away. Nevertheless, the international discussion about restitution of looted cultural heritage has been given new momentum by the report, and major museums and other collections not only in France have intensified their cooperation with African institutions and art historians.

Selected objects from the collections

African collection

Asian collection

Americas collection

Oceania collection

Buildings 

The museum complex has four buildings, occupying , which, along with the garden, cost 233 million euros to construct.
It is constructed like a huge bridge, 10 meters over the garden, supported by two large concrete silos at the east and west ends and by 26 steel columns. As the trees of the garden around the building grow, the columns will be completely hidden and the building will appear to be resting on the treetops.

Visitors enter the main building through a small entrance, and then follow a winding ramp up a gentle slope to the main gallery, two hundred meters long. The main gallery is relatively dark inside, with a small amount of sunlight entering from outside, and with direct lighting only on the exhibited objects from the permanent collection. Thirty different galleries are placed on the north side, which are visible on the outside of the structure as boxes of different colours. Three mezzanines look down on the main gallery; the center mezzanine is the multimedia center, and the other two mezzanines are used for temporary exhibits. The west mezzanine has a new exhibition every 18 months, while the exhibition on the east mezzanine changes each year. The garden side of the building contains an auditorium, classrooms, lecture hall, multimedia library and a bookshop.
 The separate Branly building contains administrative offices, and has 140 work spaces on five floors. Its most unusual feature is the green wall, or wall of vegetation, composed of living plants, on the north side of the building, facing the Seine.
 The Auvent building, connected by footbridges with the Branly building, has 60 work spaces, and houses the Jacques Kerchache lecture hall and an archive of 700,000 photographs and sound recordings.
 The building on the rue de l'Université contains the museum's workshops and library. The ceilings and façade of the building are decorated with the works of eight Indigenous Australian contemporary artists, four men and four women: Ningura Napurrula, Lena Nyadbi, Judy Watson, Gulumbu Yunupingu, John Mawurndjul, Paddy Nyunkuny Bedford, Michael Riley and Yannima Tommy Watson.

Théâtre Claude Lévi-Strauss
The theatre is situated under the main hall and is also accessible from the garden. It was designed by Jean Nouvel with the cooperation of dUCKS scéno for the scenography and Jean-Paul Lamoureux for its acoustics. This auditorium is used for concerts, film shows or public conferences. It allows several configurations thanks to acoustic curtains conceived by Issey Miyake.

Gardens

In the original project for the museum, 7,500 square meters of the 25,000-square-meter site were set aside for gardens. They were designed by landscape architect Gilles Clément, and present the exact opposite of a traditional French formal garden: There are no fences, no lawn, no gates, no monumental stairway; instead, Clément composed a tapestry of small gardens, with streams, hills, pools, and groves, using the native French plants and imported plants accustomed to the Paris climate. Originally, 169 trees and 72,000 plants were planted.

On the north side, facing the street along the Seine, the garden is protected by a high double wall of plate glass, which blocks most of the sound from the street. The gardens on the north side practically hide the museum building. Instead of straight paths and a long axis to the entrance, the paths wind through the gardens, with no apparent destination.

Another notable feature of the Museum garden is the green wall, or wall of vegetation, created by botanist Patrick Blanc. It includes 15,000 plants of 150 different varieties, coming from Japan, China, the Americas and Central Europe.

Library 

The museum has a library with 3 main departments:

the book collection, with two reading rooms—a research reading room on the top floor and a popular reading room on the ground floor
the picture collection with photographs and drawings
the archive collection

Many of the specialized scientific journals, data bases, documents, visual or audiovisual objects can be accessed online. Moreover, the library also holds collections from important ethnologists, including Georges Condominas, Françoise Girard, and Nesterenko, as well as that of art collector Jacques Kerchache.

Publications 
The museum has published many catalogues and various other publications, among them:
 Aztèques. La collection de sculptures du musée du Quai Branly, by Leonardo López Luján and Marie-France Fauvet-Berthelot (2005).

It has also co-published several noted ethnomusicology audio sets with Frémeaux & Associés, including booklets in both French and English, among which:
 Les Indiens d'Amérique 1960–1961, American First Nations Authentic Recordings 1960–1961
 The Color Line, Les Artistes Africains-Américains et la Ségrégation – 1916–1962
 Haiti Vodou, Folk Trance Possession, Ritual Music From the First Black Republic 1937–1962
 Jamaica – Roots of Rastafari, Mystic Music From Jamaica – Folk, Trance, Possession 1939–1961
 Madagascar, Traditional Music From the South West

Criticism and controversy 
Vacillation over the museum's name reflected tensions about its scope and viewpoint.

Not all critics were pleased with the new museum when it opened.  Michael Kimmelman, architecture critic of The New York Times, published a review on 2 July 2006 entitled "Heart of Darkness in the City of Light".  He called the museum "a missed opportunity and an inexplicable exercise" and said it was "devised as a spooky jungle, red and black and murky, the objects in it chosen and arranged with hardly any discernible logic.  The place is briefly thrilling, as spectacle, but brow-slappingly wrongheaded....The place simply makes no sense. Old, new, good, bad are jumbled all together without much reason or explanation, save for visual theatrics."

The MQB was involved in a controversy over the return of Maori tattooed heads, known as mokomokai, held in France. The controversy arose after a museum in Normandy decided to return a tattooed head to New Zealand. Since 2003, the Te Papa Tongarewa, New Zealand's national museum, has embarked on a program of requesting the return of Maori remains held in institutions around the world. While the MQB was initially reluctant to return the mokomokai to New Zealand, a change in French law in 2010 allowed for discussions which resulted in repatriation. The mokomokai were formally returned to New Zealand on 23 January 2012 and they are now housed at Te Papa and are not on display.

Australian Art Market Report, Issue 23, Autumn 2007, pages 32–34:
"Twelve months after the opening of Musée du quai Branly in Paris, journalist Jeremy Eccles takes a look at what effect, if any, the museum" (where contemporary Aboriginal art forms an integral part of the architectural structure) " has had on ... Aboriginal art".

In this article, he quotes Bernice Murphy – co-founder of the Sydney MCA and now National Director of Museums Australia and Chair of the Ethics Committee of the International Council of Museums. She told a Sydney symposium on "Australian Arts in an International Context" that she found the whole of Quai Branly to be a "regressive museology" and the presentation of Aboriginal art "in a vegetal environment" to be "an exotic mise en scène" in the worst taste. 

There is some speculation that the museum also plays a key political role for France. At the time the museum opened in 2007, France was still attempting to reconcile increasing ethnic diversity among the nation's population within its republican model of assimilation, and even homogeneity. From this perspective, the museum can be seen as a symbolic effort to reach out to non-Western peoples of the world, while also proclaiming French openness to the world. Given this supposed motivation behind the museum, there has been some controversy among intellectuals as to what the museum's ultimate purpose is, and whether or not the presentation of the galleries actually achieves this purpose.

Furthermore, there has also been controversy as to whether the artifacts on display should be viewed as anthropological objects or as pieces of art. The Portuguese anthropologist Nélia Dias grapples with this question by examining the tension between museum anthropology and general museum practices. In conclusion, she writes, "If the dichotomy of formal presentation versus contextual presentation is no longer relevant to museum anthropology practice, Branly does not seem to solve, in its permanent gallery, the dilemma between anthropology and aesthetics. By contrast, its temporary exhibits attempt to overcome such a dilemma and to open new venues through the display of objects in an historical and cross-cultural perspective. Whether this will lead to a new path remains to be seen."

See also 
 List of museums in Paris

References

Citations

Bibliography
 
 
 Jolly, Margaret. "Becoming a 'new' museum? Contesting oceanic visions at Musee du Quai Branly." The Contemporary Pacific 23#1 (2011), p. 108+. online

External links 
 Musée du quai Branly (site in French, English and Spanish)
 Gradhiva, journal published by the Musée du quai Branly
The Musée du Quai Branly - architect: Jean Nouvel - a case study on Constructalia 
London Review of Books article 
International Herald Tribune article
"Narratives of Colonisation: the Musée du Quai Branly in context", in reCollections, Journal of the National Museum of Australia, vol.2, n°2, September 2007
Virtual tour of the Musée du Quai Branly – Jacques Chirac provided by Google Arts & Culture

2006 establishments in France
Art museums and galleries in Paris
Art museums established in 2006
Asian art museums in France
Buildings and structures in the 7th arrondissement of Paris
Ethnographic museums in France
Jean Nouvel buildings
Museums in Paris
National museums of France